Romitan is a city and seat of Romitan District in Bukhara Region in Uzbekistan. The town population was 9,636 people in 1989, and 14,300 in 2016.

References

Populated places in Bukhara Region
Cities in Uzbekistan